Taj Mahal is a 1963 film based on the historical legend of the Mughal emperor Shah Jahan, who built the Taj Mahal in fond remembrance and as a tomb for his beloved wife Mumtaz Mahal.

Taj Mahal was a commercial hit, but is remembered mostly for its Filmfare award-winning music.

Plot
It was at the Meena Bazar that Shehzada Khurram first laid eyes on Arjuman Banu. When their eyes met, it was love at first sight for both of them. When Queen Noor Jehan, one of the wives of Shahenshah Jehangir, finds out she is enraged, as she wants Khurram to marry her daughter, Ladli Banu, even though Arjuman is her niece. She plots to hold Arjuman as a prisoner in her palace, but in vain; then she attempts to have Khurram sent away to battle - again in vain, as Khurram returns triumphant, and is named 'Shah Jehan'. Then she has her step-son, Saifuddin, arrange to kill Khurram - again in vain. Khurram gets stabbed but with Arjuman's help he recovers, returns home, but does not tell his father, fearing for his health. When Jehangir hears of Arjuman's assistance, he gladly arranges their marriage, while Saifuddin ends up marrying Ladli. Then Khurram is sent away to another kingdom, leaving Noor Jehan to plot against him. When Jehangir falls ill, she takes over the reins, has Khurram declared an intruder and sends her armies to bring him in or alternatively his two sons. Watch as events unfold, which will ultimately lead to the building of one of the seven wonders of the world - The Taj Mahal.

Cast 
 Pradeep Kumar as Shehzada Khurram / Shah Jahan
 Bina Rai as Arjumand Banoo / Mumtaz Mahal
 Rehman as the Mughal Emperor Jahangir
 Jeevan as Shehzada Shahryar
 Veena as Nur Jahan / Mehrunissa
 Helen as Court Dancer - Song "Na Nare Na Na"

Music
The movie's musical score is by Roshan, lyrics are by Sahir Ludhianvi and most of the songs are performed by Mohammed Rafi and Lata Mangeshkar.

Track list

Awards
 1964: Filmfare Award for Best Lyricist: Sahir Ludhianvi
 1964: Filmfare Award for Best Music Director: Roshan
 1964: Filmfare Award for Best Female Playback Singer: Lata Mangeshkar for Jo Wada Kiya Wo (nominated)

See also
 Taj Mahal: An Eternal Love Story

References

External links
 

Indian epic films
1960s Hindi-language films
1963 films
Indian biographical films
Films set in the 17th century
Films set in the Mughal Empire
Films set in Uttar Pradesh
Films scored by Roshan
Indian historical films
1960s historical films
Cultural depictions of Shah Jahan
Cultural depictions of Jahangir
1960s biographical films
Films directed by M. Sadiq